Henrik Nielsen may refer to:

 Henrik Nielsen (gymnast) (1886–1973), Norwegian gymnast
 Henrik Nielsen (footballer born 1965), former Danish footballer
 Henrik Nielsen (footballer born 1971), retired Danish footballer
 Henrik Frystyk Nielsen (born 1969), Danish engineer and computer scientist
 Henrik Overgaard-Nielsen, Danish dentist and politician